Richard E. Mannix (December 18, 1928 – July 11, 2011) was an American politician who served in the New York State Assembly from the 91st district from 1973 to 1976.

He died on July 11, 2011, in Larchmont, New York at age 82.

References

1928 births
2011 deaths
Republican Party members of the New York State Assembly